Jessica Treadway (born 1961 Albany, New York) is an American short story writer.

Life
She was raised in Albany, New York.
She graduated from the State University of New York at Albany, and from Boston University, with an MA.
She worked as a reporter for United Press International. 
She held a fellowship at the Bunting Institute of Radcliffe College, and taught at Tufts University.  She teaches at Emerson College.

Her fiction has been published in The Atlantic, Ploughshares, The Hudson Review, Glimmer Train, AGNI, Five Points.

She wrote the libretto for composer Ellen Bender’s opera after Nathaniel Hawthorne’s The Marble Faun, and served as literary co-translator of “A Crowning Experience” by Kostiantyn Moskalets in From Three Worlds: New Writing From the Ukraine.
She is on the Board of Directors of PEN-New England.

She lives in Lexington, Massachusetts with her husband, Philip Holland.

Awards
 National Endowment for the Arts
 Massachusetts Cultural Council.
 1993 John C. Zacharis First Book Award
 2009 Flannery O'Connor Award for Short Fiction

Works
 Please Come Back To Me, short stories, University of Georgia Press, October 2010

Anthologies
 The Best American Short Stories
 The O. Henry Prize Stories

References

External links
"Author' website"
"Professor Profile: Jessica Treadway", Vernacular, September 16th, 2009 
"Review by: Emily Koon", Women Writers, May 2003

1961 births
American women short story writers
Writers from Albany, New York
University at Albany, SUNY alumni
Boston University alumni
Tufts University faculty
Emerson College faculty
Living people
20th-century American short story writers
21st-century American short story writers
20th-century American women writers
21st-century American women writers
American women academics